A double dagger  is a typographical mark used to indicate a footnote.

Double dagger may also refer to:

 Double Dagger (band), an American post-punk band
 Double Dagger (album), the band's 2003 debut album

See also
 Dagger (disambiguation)
 Half sharp, a musical notation that resembles a double dagger mark
 Double Cross (disambiguation)